Red Comet: The Short Life and Blazing Art of Sylvia Plath is a 2020 book by Heather Clark that examines Sylvia Plath. The book has four "positive" reviews, thirteen "rave" reviews, and three "mixed" reviews, according to review aggregator Book Marks. It was selected for the New York Times Book Reviews "10 Best Books of 2021" list and was the a finalist for the 2021 Pulitzer Prize for Biography or Autobiography.

References

2020 non-fiction books
English-language books
Alfred A. Knopf books
Sylvia Plath